Lucius is a given name and a surname in various languages.

Lucius may refer to:
 Lucius (praenomen), a Latin praenomen in ancient Rome
 Lucius (band)
 Lucius (play), a 1717 work by Delarivier Manley
 Lucius, a performer in the English hip pop quintet KING

Zoology
 Labeobarbus lucius, a species of ray-finned fish in the genus Labeobarbus
 Channa lucius, a species of snakehead, a fish of the family Channidae
 Esox lucius, known simply as a pike, a species of carnivorous fish of the genus Esox
 Ptychocheilus lucius, the largest cyprinid fish of North America
 Rhamphochromis lucius, a species of fish in the family Cichlidae

Other uses
 Lucius Hunt, Australian progressive alternative rock band
 Lucius Clapp Memorial, historic memorial in Stoughton, Massachusetts
 Lucius Knowles House, historic house in Worcester, Massachusetts
 Lucius Gleason House, also known as Liverpool Village Hall, in Liverpool, New York
 The Lucius Beebe EP, a 2007 5-song live mini-album by Trey Anastasio
 Lucius (video game), a 2012 video game
Lucius (horse), a racehorse who won the 1978 Grand National

See also
 Saint Lucius (disambiguation)